Castegnato is a town and comune in the Italian province of Brescia, in Lombardy.

References

Cities and towns in Lombardy